Choi Kun-Sik  (Hangul: 최근식; born 25 April 1981 in Gyeonggi-do) is a South Korean footballer. Position is forward.

Club statistics

External links 

1981 births
Living people
Association football defenders
South Korean footballers
South Korean expatriate footballers
Daejeon Hana Citizen FC players
Changwon City FC players
Tochigi SC players
Roasso Kumamoto players
J2 League players
Korea National League players
K League 1 players
Expatriate footballers in Japan
South Korean expatriate sportspeople in Japan
Konkuk University alumni
Expatriate footballers in Thailand
Sportspeople from Gyeonggi Province